A vast number of freshwater species have successfully adapted to live in the aquarium. This list gives some examples of the most common species found in home aquariums.

Catfish

Characins and other characiformes

Cichlids

Cyprinids

Loaches and related cypriniformes

Live-bearers and killifish

Labyrinth fish

Rainbowfish

Gobies and sleepers

Sunfish and relatives

Other fish

See also 
List of aquarium fish by scientific name
List of brackish aquarium fish species
List of fish common names
List of freshwater aquarium amphibian species
List of freshwater aquarium invertebrate species
List of freshwater aquarium plant species
List of marine aquarium fish species
List of marine aquarium invertebrate species
The Aquarium Wiki Encyclopaedia List of Freshwater aquarium fish
Non-fish organisms commonly kept in freshwater including:
Red Cherry Shrimp (Neocaridina davidi)
Dwarf Crayfish (Cambarellus spp.)
Marbled Crayfish (Procambarus virginalis)

Sources 

 Encyclopedia of Aquarium and Pond Fish (2005) (David Alderton)
 500 Aquarium Fish: A Visual Reference to the Most Popular Species

References

Aquarium,Freshwater
Freshwater fish